Heavy Soul  may refer to:
 Heavy Soul (Paul Weller album)
 Heavy Soul (Ike Quebec album)
 Heavy Soul (Atomic Rooster album)